Kulukkallur railway station  is a major railway station serving the village of Kulukkallur, near Pattambi in the Palakkad district of Kerala. It lies in the Shoranur–Mangalore section of the Southern Railways. Trains halting at the station connect the town to prominent cities in India such as Nilambur, Shoranur and Angadipuram.

Shoranur–Nilambur railway line
The Nilambur–Shoranur railway line is a branch line of the Southern Railway zone in Kerala state and one of the shortest broad-gauge railway lines in India. It is a single line with  length running from Shoranur Junction (in Palakkad district) to Nilambur railway station (in Malappuram district).  This station is 4 km from the town of Nilambur on the Kozhikode–Ooty highway. Shoranur–Nilambur Road passenger trains are running on this route.
It has recently 17-02-1958 been decided to provide a contractor operated Halt station at Kulukkallur between Vallapuzha and Cherukara Railway stations on Southern Railway and that Railway  has been asked to take further necessary action in the matter early 

References

Railway stations in Palakkad district
Nilambur–Shoranur railway line
Railway stations opened in 1921